Juan Américo Díaz (12 November 1944 – 29 May 2013) was a Bolivian footballer. He played in four matches for the Bolivia national football team in 1975. He was also part of Bolivia's squad for the 1975 Copa América tournament.

References

External links
 

1944 births
2013 deaths
Bolivian footballers
Bolivia international footballers
Place of birth missing
Association football forwards
The Strongest players
Club Bolívar players
Club Always Ready players
Chaco Petrolero players